WAQP (channel 49) is a religious television station licensed to Saginaw, Michigan, United States, serving northeastern Michigan as an owned-and-operated station of Tri-State Christian Television (TCT). The station's transmitter is located near Chesaning, Michigan.

Technical information

Subchannels
The station's digital signal is multiplexed:

Analog-to-digital conversion
WAQP discontinued regular programming on its analog signal, over UHF channel 49, on June 12, 2009, the official date in which full-power television stations in the United States transitioned from analog to digital broadcasts under federal mandate. The station's digital signal remained on its pre-transition UHF channel 48, using PSIP to display the station's virtual channel as its former UHF analog channel 49. Its physical channel was later moved to 36.

Translators
WAQP previously operated a rebroadcaster on channel 27 in Lansing, which uses the callsign WLNM-LD. That channel was originally W69BJ channel 69, but it relocated to channel 27 as W27CN in November 2003. Since July 2009, WLNM-LD has been broadcasting in digital-only format. The WLNM-LD digital broadcast uses the station's former analog channel 27 number, both in actual channel designation and via PSIP display, and mirrors the main WAQP broadcast. On February 14, 2020, TCT agreed to sell WLNM-LD to Gray Television for $175,000; the sale, which was completed on May 1, includes a lease agreement allowing TCT to program a WLNM subchannel for five years after closing (it was placed on the station's seventh subchannel). WLNM-LD now operates as a translator of NBC affiliate WILX-TV (channel 10), and WILX-DT7 also carries TCT throughout the entire market as a side effect of the transaction.

WAQP also originally had a repeater serving Jackson, W59CA channel 59, which was relocated to Ann Arbor in November 2000 and renamed "W27CJ" channel 27, repeating a low-powered TCT station in Detroit, WDWO-CD. In October 2007, W27CJ was sold to SMG Media Group for $80,000, with the intent on operating the channel as "WFHD-LP"; that station, however, would soon go silent altogether.

References

External links
TCT

Television channels and stations established in 1985
AQP
1985 establishments in Michigan
Tri-State Christian Television affiliates
Laff (TV network) affiliates
Ion Mystery affiliates
Grit (TV network) affiliates
Defy TV affiliates
TheGrio affiliates
TrueReal affiliates
Scripps News affiliates
True Crime Network affiliates
GetTV affiliates